KREK 104.9 FM is a radio station licensed to Bristow, Oklahoma. The station broadcasts a Religious format and is owned by Family Worship Center Church Inc.

References

External links
http://sonlifetv.com

REK
Country radio stations in the United States